Akhjar is a village in Afghanistan, located in the Rustak Valley, about four miles north of Rustak. At the beginning of the 20th century, there were 112 Hazara houses in the village.

References

Populated places in Takhar Province